Jimmy Mason is a footballer who played as a wing half in the Football League for Accrington Stanley and Chester.

References

1933 births
Living people
Footballers from Glasgow
Association football wing halves
Scottish footballers
Rutherglen Glencairn F.C. players
Dundee F.C. players
Scottish Football League players
Accrington Stanley F.C. (1891) players
Chester City F.C. players
Chelmsford City F.C. players
English Football League players
Scottish Junior Football Association players